Tinearupa sorenseni is a moth of the family Oecophoridae first described by John Salmon and John David Bradley in 1956. It is endemic to New Zealand.

Subspecies
This species contains the following two subspecies:
Tinearupa sorenseni aucklandica Dugdale, 1971
Tinearupa sorenseni sorenseni Salmon & Bradley, 1956

References

Moths described in 1956
Oecophoridae
Moths of New Zealand
Endemic fauna of New Zealand
Taxa named by John Salmon
Endemic moths of New Zealand